Martin Peyerl (11 August 1983 – 1 November 1999) was a German student who, on 1 November 1999 (the day of All Saints), fired from his bedroom window, killing four people and wounding seven others before committing suicide.

Biography
Born to Rudolf and Theresa Peyerl on 11 August 1983, Martin Peyerl and his sister Daniela lived with their parents on a busy street in Bad Reichenhall, Germany.

After the shooting, no clear motive has been presented for Peyerl's actions. Peyerl's status as an outsider at school, and that he had an alcoholic father at home who was frequently unemployed, have been regarded as possible influences. Peyerl was an avid gun enthusiast and frequently purchased gun magazines. He told classmates that he sometimes went to the forest looking for birds "to shoot" and sometimes practiced shooting with his father in the garage. Rudolf Peyerl, a twelve-year veteran of the German Army, was himself enthusiastic about firearms, owning as many as nineteen. A few months prior to 1 November, Martin was temporarily expelled from school because of Nazi photographs pasted in his notebook.

Neighbors said that Peyerl was a normal albeit introverted boy, but a psychiatrist who was involved in this case spoke of a loser type. Descriptions of Martin by former classmates were strikingly similar to descriptions given by classmates of Eric Harris and Dylan Klebold (who perpetrated the Columbine High School massacre). He is said to have been a shy loner who preferred playing video games over talking to people. One classmate, Stefanie Hocheder, said "Martin was always nice", but that he was largely ignored and rarely had anything to say. Another said Martin was "a bit of a right-wing".

Given the similarities between the shooters at Columbine and Martin Peyerl and the short amount of time between their respective rampages, it is possible Peyerl was influenced by the massacre at Columbine High School on 20 April 1999. Martin commented one day leading up to 1 November 1999, that it was "completely crazy what these guys have done" and that he believed Harris' and Klebold's actions to be "something we should do".

The shooting

On 1 November 1999, Peyerl's parents left the house to visit the grave of one of Peyerl's grandparents in Piding, something they typically did on All Saints Day. Martin did not go with them. Instead, in their absence, he broke into his father's gun cabinet- which contained more than ten firearms- where he stole a Ruger Mini-14 and positioned himself in his bedroom window, and began shooting at anything that moved. Peyerl killed neighbors Ruth and Horst Zillenbiller, then a 54-year-old patient at the hospital across the street when he stepped outside to smoke. Seven others were ultimately wounded, among them actor Günter Lamprecht.

His sister Daniela, a nanny at the hospital across the street, came home at around noon. According to police, a struggle of some kind occurred between the two, ending when Martin shot his sister five times and killed her. He then fatally shot the family cat, sat down in a bathtub, and committed suicide with a single blast from a shotgun. Police stormed the house at 6:00 p.m., finding the bodies of Daniela and Martin Peyerl along with the cat. An enormous swastika was painted above Peyerl's bed; in his room were a number of additional painted swastikas and other Nazi symbols. A number of videos and CDs with violent content were also discovered. A portrait of Adolf Hitler hung above the bed of Peyerl's sister.

Aftermath
Numerous politicians in Germany called for changes in German firearm legislation following Peyerl's indiscriminate shooting on 1 November 1999. Rudolf and Theresa Peyerl were interviewed as witnesses by police shortly after, and the German Kriminalpolizei started an investigation. Wolfgang Giese, head of the investigation, denied the possibility that drugs, alcohol, or extreme right-wing ideology were behind Peyerl's actions, saying those things played "no role". Instead, Giese asserted, the problem was "in the personality of the offender".

Investigators concluded that Martin Peyerl, like Eric Harris and Dylan Klebold, did not commit murder-suicide as a spontaneous act, but likely planned his actions well in advance. Peyerl left behind no journal or videos as the Columbine killers did, however, leaving his actions for the most part a mystery. Despite this, investigators remained certain that Peyerl's own death was as much a part of whatever plan he devised as the indiscriminate shooting of others.

External links 
 Der Martin war immer nett, Der Spiegel (45/1999)
 Fünfter Toter nach Amoklauf, Spiegel Online (2 September 1999)

1983 births
1999 deaths
1999 mass shootings in Europe
1999 suicides
Criminal snipers
Mass murder in 1999
German mass murderers
Deaths by firearm in Germany
Suicides by firearm in Germany
Murder–suicides in Germany
Mass shootings in Germany
German children
Columbine High School massacre copycat crimes